George Mifflin Dallas (February 7, 1839 – January 21, 1917) was a United States circuit judge of the United States Court of Appeals for the Third Circuit and of the United States Circuit Courts for the Third Circuit.

Education and career

Born on February 7, 1839, in Pittsburgh, Pennsylvania, Dallas read law in 1859. He entered private practice in Philadelphia, Pennsylvania starting in 1859. He was a Professor of Law for the University of Pennsylvania.

Federal judicial service

Dallas was nominated by President Benjamin Harrison on December 16, 1891, to the United States Court of Appeals for the Third Circuit and the United States Circuit Courts for the Third Circuit, to a new joint seat authorized by 26 Stat. 826. He was confirmed by the United States Senate on March 17, 1892, and received his commission the same day. His service terminated on May 24, 1909, due to his retirement.

Death

Dallas died on January 21, 1917.

References

Sources
 

1839 births
1917 deaths
Lawyers from Pittsburgh
Judges of the United States Court of Appeals for the Third Circuit
United States federal judges appointed by Benjamin Harrison
19th-century American judges
19th-century American politicians
United States federal judges admitted to the practice of law by reading law